The Kota Tinggi Museum is a museum in Kota Tinggi Town, Kota Tinggi District, Johor, Malaysia. The museum is about the history of Johor Sultanate.

History
The museum was constructed in 1997 and opened in 2002. In 2019, the museum was reopened with an additional section of an art gallery after it was closed down for almost six years for upgrading works.

Architecture
The museum is housed in a two-story building.

Exhibitions
The museum exhibits the history of Johor Lama as well as various weaponry artifacts.

See also
 List of museums in Malaysia

References

2002 establishments in Malaysia
Museums in Johor
Kota Tinggi District
Museums established in 2002